The Joint Select Committee on Solvency of Multiemployer Pension Plans was established on February 9, 2018, during the 115th United States Congress under Section 30422 of .

Members, 115th Congress

Sources
 http://www.pionline.com/article/20180228/ONLINE/180229842/senate-republicans-named-to-congressional-multiemployer-pension-committee
 http://www.pionline.com/article/20180226/ONLINE/180229873/senate-democrats-named-to-multiemployer-committee
 http://www.pionline.com/article/20180223/ONLINE/180229916/house-members-appointed-to-multiemployer-panel

External links 
 Committee site

Committee Solvency of Multiemployer Pension Plans
Solvency of Multiemployer Pension Plans